XHHO-FM is a radio station on 97.7 FM in Ciudad Obregón, Sonora. It is owned by Radio S.A. and carries its Máxima format.

History
XEHO-AM 910 received its concession on February 7, 1957. It was owned by Josefina María de García de León and broadcast with 1,000 watts day and 250 night. XEHO was bought by Radio Son, S.A. (in 1972), Sistemas Publicitarios y de Mercadotecnia de Obregón, S.A. de C.V. (in 1992), and Fantasía Musical 58, S.A. de C.V. (in 2004). By the time of the latter acquisition, XEHO had moved to 580 kHz.

The current concessionaire was created in 2011, the same year that XEHO was cleared to move to FM as XHHO-FM 97.7.

References

Radio stations in Sonora
Mexican radio stations with expired concessions